The 2013–14 USC Trojans men's basketball team represented the University of Southern California during the 2013–14 NCAA Division I men's basketball season. They were led by former FGCU and first year head coach Andy Enfield. They played their home games at the Galen Center and are members of the Pac-12 Conference.

Departures

Roster

Schedule and results

 
|-
!colspan=9| Regular season

|-
!colspan=9| Pac-12 tournament

References

USC
USC Trojans men's basketball seasons
USC Trojans
USC Trojans